Acartiidae is a family of calanoid copepods distinguishable by the rostral margin not being extended. There are over 100 described species distributed throughout the world's oceans, mainly in temperate areas.

References

Calanoida
Crustacean families